Hodge is a surname. Notable people with the surname include:

Abdul Hodge (born 1983), American football linebacker
Al Hodge (1912–1979), American actor
Al Hodge (rock musician) (1951–2006), guitarist and songwriter
Alan Hodge (1915–1979), English historian
Aldis Hodge (born 1986), American actor
Archibald Alexander Hodge (1823–1886), American Presbyterian leader
Arthur William Hodge (1763–1811), murderer
Bill Hodge (1882–1958), Scottish football manager
Bob Hodge (linguist) (born 1940), Australian linguist
Brad Hodge (born 1974), Australian cricketer
Charles Hodge (1797–1878), principal of Princeton Theological Seminary
Dallas Hodge (born 1954), American blues musician and record producer
Daniel Hodge, Prime Minister of Curaçao 2012–13
Danny Hodge (1932–2020), American professional boxer and wrestler
Darius Hodge (born 1998), American football player
Dave Hodge (born 1945), Canadian sports announcer currently working for The Sports Network
Douglas Hodge (businessman) (born 1957), American CEO of PIMCO, charged with fraud for allegedly participating in the 2019 college admissions bribery scandal
Frederick A. Hodge, American businessman and politician
Frederick Webb Hodge (1864–1956), anthropologist
Harold Hodge (1904–1990), toxicologist, first president of the Society of Toxicology
Henry Wilson Hodge (1865-1919), American civil engineer
Huck Hodge (born 1977), American composer
Kevin and Keith Hodge (born 1974), American comedians
John R. Hodge (1893–1963), American general
John E. Hodge (1914–1996), American chemist, author of a widely cited paper on the Maillard reaction
Jonathan Hodge (1941–2019), British composer
Julius Hodge (born 1983), American professional basketball player
KhaDarel Hodge (born 1995), American football player
Luke Hodge (born 1984), Australian rules footballer
Matthew Henry Hodge (1805–1877), Congregationalist minister in Port Adelaide, South Australia
Margaret Hodge (born 1944), British politician
Megan Hodge (born 1988), American indoor volleyball player at Penn State
Milford Hodge (born 1961), American football player
Odell Hodge (born 1973), American basketball player at Old Dominion University
Omar Hodge, British Virgin Islands politician
Patricia Hodge (born 1946), British actor
Paul Hodge (1910–1976), American bridge player
Paul W. Hodge (born 1934), American astronomer
Philip G. Hodge (1920–2014), American material scientist
Samuel Hodge VC (1840–1868), British Virgin Islands war hero
Steve Hodge (born 1962), English footballer
Sue Hodge (born 1957), British actress
Susie Hodge (born 1960), British author and illustrator
W. V. D. Hodge (1903–1975), Scottish mathematician and geometer
Walter Hartman Hodge (1896–1975), American judge

Fictional characters 
Cameron Hodge, comic-book supervillain
Orson Hodge, a fictional supporting character in the television drama, Desperate Housewives

See also
 Hodges (surname)

English-language surnames
Surnames from given names